The 1970 San Francisco State Gators football team represented San Francisco State College—now known as San Francisco State University—as a member of the Far Western Conference (FWC) during the 1970 NCAA College Division football season. Led by tenth-year head coach Vic Rowen, San Francisco State compiled an overall record of 0–9–1 with a mark of 0–4 in conference play, placing last out of the five championship-eligible teams in the FWC. For the season the team was outscored by its opponents 372 to 99. The Gators played home games at Cox Stadium in San Francisco.

Schedule

References

San Francisco State
San Francisco State Gators football seasons
San Francisco State Gators football